Stanislav Viktorovich Rudenko (born 26 October 1962) is a Russian football coach and a former player.

Honours
Individual
Toulon Tournament Best Goalkeeper: 1983

References

1962 births
Sportspeople from Rostov-on-Don
Living people
Russian people of Ukrainian descent
Soviet footballers
FC Oryol players
FC SKA Rostov-on-Don players
FC Rostov players
FC Taganrog players
FC Kuban Krasnodar players
Russian footballers
FC Chernomorets Novorossiysk players
Russian Premier League players
Association football goalkeepers
PFC CSKA Moscow players
FC Nosta Novotroitsk players